Damani may refer to the following notable people 
Given name
Damani Horton (born 1979), Bahamian football defender
Damani Nkosi, American rapper
Damani Ralph (born 1980), Jamaican football forward
Damani Sewell (born 1994), Jamaican cricketer

Surname
Brijesh Damani (born 1982), Indian professional snooker player
Harji Lavji Damani, Indian Gujarati-language poet, novelist and playwright
Muhammad Usman Damani, 19th century Muslim scholar 
Radhakishan Damani, Indian businessman
Surajratan Fatehchand Damani (1912-1995), Indian politician